The Long Good Friday is a 1980 British gangster film directed by John Mackenzie from a screenplay by Barrie Keeffe, starring Bob Hoskins and Helen Mirren. Set in London, the storyline weaves together events and concerns of the late 1970s, including mid-level political and police corruption, and IRA fund-raising. The supporting cast features Eddie Constantine, Dave King, Bryan Marshall, Derek Thompson, Paul Freeman and Pierce Brosnan in his film debut. 

The film was completed in 1979, but because of release delays, it is generally credited as an ‘80s film. It received positive reviews from critics, and Bob Hoskins was nominated for the BAFTA Award for Best Actor in a Leading Role and won a Evening Standard Film Award for his performance as gangster Harold Shand. It was voted at number 21 in the British Film Institute's Top 100 British films list, and provided Hoskins with his breakthrough film role. In 2016, British film magazine Empire ranked The Long Good Friday number 19 in its list of The 100 best British films.

Plot
A man delivers money to an unknown recipient in Belfast, in the process taking some of the cash for himself. As the recipients are counting the money in a country farm house they are attacked by uniformed gunmen. Soon afterwards Phil, the driver for the delivery, is kidnapped and killed. Later the delivery man, Colin, is murdered at a London swimming pool.

Harold Shand, a London gangster, is aspiring to become a legitimate businessman and is trying to form a partnership with Charlie, an American mafioso, with a plan to redevelop London Docklands, in association with local construction boss Councillor Harris. Shand's world is suddenly destabilised by a series of bomb attacks on his property and murders of his associates, including his old friend Colin. He and his henchmen try to uncover his attackers' identities by threatening corrupt police officers, informers, and other criminals, whilst simultaneously trying not to worry their visitors, fearing the Americans will abandon him if they think he's not in full control. Shand's girlfriend, Victoria, tells the Mafia representatives he is under attack from an unknown enemy, but assures them Shand is working to quickly resolve the crisis. She starts to suspect Shand's right hand man, Jeff, knows more about who is behind the attacks than he claims.

After some investigation, Shand confronts Jeff, who confesses that under pressure from Councillor Harris he sent Colin and Phil to Belfast to deliver money to the Provisional Irish Republican Army (IRA) on behalf of Harris. He explains that three of the IRA's top men were killed on the same night, after the money was delivered. Shand realises the IRA have come to the conclusion that he sold them out to the security forces and pocketed the missing cash for himself, and are targeting his organisation in revenge. Vowing to destroy the terrorist organisation in London, Shand loses his temper and kills Jeff in a frenzy.

After confronting Harris, Shand sets up a meeting with the IRA's London leadership at a stock car racetrack. He ostensibly offers them £60,000 in return for a ceasefire but double crosses them and has them and Harris shot as they are counting the cash. Believing his enemies are dead and the problem solved, Shand travels to the Savoy Hotel to triumphantly inform Charlie and his assistant Tony, only to find the Americans preparing to leave, having been spooked by the carnage. In response to their derisory comments about the UK, Shand berates them for their arrogance and dismisses them as cowards.

Leaving the hotel, Shand steps into his chauffeur-driven car only to find it has been commandeered by IRA assassins. He sees Victoria being also kidnapped in another car. As the car speeds to an unknown destination, Shand contemplates the inevitability of his fate.

Cast

 Bob Hoskins as Harold Shand
 Helen Mirren as Victoria
 Dave King as Parky
 Bryan Marshall as Councillor Harris
 Derek Thompson as Jeff
 Eddie Constantine as Charlie
 Paul Freeman as Colin
 P. H. Moriarty as Razors
 Stephen Davies as Tony
 Brian Hall as Alan
 Alan Ford as Jack
 Paul Barber as Errol
 Pauline Melville as Dora
 Patti Love as Carol
 Nigel Humphreys as Dave
 Karl Howman as David
 Gillian Taylforth as Sherry
 George Coulouris as Gus
 Trevor Laird as Jim
 Roy Alon as Captain Death
 Tony Rohr as O'Flaherty
 Pierce Brosnan and Daragh O'Malley as IRA men
 Leo Dolan as Phil
 Dexter Fletcher as Kid
 Kevin McNally as Irish youth

Production
The film was directed by John Mackenzie and produced for £930,000 by Barry Hanson from a script by Barrie Keeffe, with a soundtrack by the composer Francis Monkman; it was screened at the Cannes, Edinburgh and London Film Festivals in 1980.

Under the title The Paddy Factor, the original story had been written by Keeffe for Hanson when the latter worked for Euston Films, a subsidiary of Thames Television. Euston did not make the film, but Hanson bought the rights from Euston for his own company Calendar Films. Although Hanson designed the film for the cinema and all contracts were negotiated under a film, not a TV agreement, the production was eventually financed by Black Lion, a subsidiary of Lew Grade's ITC Entertainment for transmission via Grade's ATV on the ITV network. The film was commissioned by Charles Denton, at the time both programme controller of ATV and managing director of Black Lion. After Grade saw the finished film, he allegedly objected to what he saw as the glorification of the IRA.

The film was scheduled to be televised with heavy cuts on 24 March 1981. Because of the planned cuts, in late 1980, Hanson attempted to buy the film back from ITC to prevent ITV screening the film. The cuts, he said, would be "execrable" and added up to "about 75 minutes of film that was literal nonsense".

Before the planned ITV transmission the rights to the film were bought from ITC by George Harrison's company, Handmade Films, for around £200,000 less than the production costs. It gave the film a cinema release.

Casting 
The role of Harold Shand was written specifically with Bob Hoskins in mind. In 1981, it was reported that Hoskins was suing both Black Lion and Calendar Films to prevent their planned release of a US TV version in which Hoskins' voice would be dubbed by English Midlands actor David Daker. Ultimately, Hoskins' voice was not dubbed.

The Long Good Friday was the film debut of Pierce Brosnan, then 25. It was also the final role of George Coulouris.

Filming locations 

 St Katharine Docks
 Civic Centre, Dagenham
 Isle of Dogs
 Heathrow Airport
 Paddington tube station
 Savoy Hotel
 St George in the East
 Ladywell Leisure Centre, Lewisham
 St Patrick's Catholic Church, Wapping
 Wandsworth Town Hall, Wandsworth

Reception
On Rotten Tomatoes, the film has an approval rating of 97% based on 29 reviews, with an average rating of 8.10/10. The website's critical consensus reads "Bob Hoskins commands a deviously sinister performance in The Long Good Friday -- a gangster flick with ferocious intelligence, tight plotting and razor-edged thrills."

Awards and nominations 

The Long Good Friday was voted at number 21 in the British Film Institute's list of the "BFI Top 100 British films" list. In 2016, Empire ranked The Long Good Friday number 19 in its list of "The 100 Best British films".

Unproduced sequel
Barrie Keeffe wrote a sequel, Black Easter Monday, set 20 years after the events of the first film. It opened with Bob Hoskins's character; Harold Shand, escaping from the IRA after the car was pulled over by police. Shand would retire to Jamaica, then return to stop the East End being taken over by the Yardies. However, the film was never made. In one of his last interviews, Keefe seemed unconcerned by the lack of development: "In some ways, I’m glad we didn’t because sequels are usually diminishing returns. To put it up there with Casablanca, no one wants Casablanca II."

Legacy 
The iconic final scene was later referenced in the ending of the TV series Brian Pern and in the film The Gentlemen.

See also
 BFI Top 100 British films

References

External links
 
 
 
 
The Long Good Friday an essay by Michael Sragow at the Criterion Collection

1980 films
1980 drama films
1980s crime drama films
1980s mystery films
1980s gang films
1980s English-language films
British crime drama films
British mystery films
British gangster films
Edgar Award-winning works
Films about corruption in the United Kingdom
Films about the Irish Republican Army
Films directed by John Mackenzie (film director)
Films set in London
Films shot in London
Films about the American Mafia
Films set in Belfast
HandMade Films films
Murder in films